John Hellyar Rickard (27 January 1940 – 10 September 2013) was a former Chief Economic Advisor to the British Government.

Education 
 Ilford County High School
 St John's College, Oxford (MA 1966; DPhil 1976)
 University of Aston in Birmingham (MSc 1969).

Career

Early career 
Lecturer, University of Aston, 1967–70; Economist, Programmes Analysis Unit, Atomic Energy Authority, Harwell, 1970–72; Research Associate and Deputy Head, Health Services Evaluation Group, Department of the Regius Professor of Medicine, University of Oxford, 1972-74.

Civil Service 
Rickard joined the Civil Service as an Economic Adviser, Department of Health and Social Security, 1974-76.  He was promoted to Senior Economic Adviser in 1976, and moved to the Department of Prices and Consumer Protection, 1976–78; Central Policy Review Staff, Cabinet Office, 1978–82; HM Treasury, 1982–84.

After a period as Economic Adviser to the State of Bahrain, 1984–87, he returned as Chief Economic Adviser to the Department of Transport, 1987-91.  He was then Under-Secretary (Economics), HM Treasury, 1991–94, then was again Chief Economic Adviser to the Department of Transport, 1994–95, after which he took early retirement from the Civil Service.

Subsequent career 
Rickard was IMF Fiscal Advisor to the Ministry of Finance, Republic of Moldova, 1995.  Since then, he has been a freelance consultant.

Since 2003, he has been a non-executive director of the Isle of Wight Healthcare NHS Trust, and a trustee of the Earl Mountbatten Hospice, Isle of Wight.

References 
Dr. John Rickard Debrett's People of Today

Civil servants in the Department of Health and Social Security
Civil servants in the Department of Prices and Consumer Protection
Civil servants in the Cabinet Office
Civil servants in HM Treasury
Civil servants in the Ministry of Transport (United Kingdom)
1940 births
2013 deaths
People from Ilford
People educated at Ilford County High School
Members of HM Government Economic Service
Alumni of St John's College, Oxford
Alumni of Aston University